Open Dialogue is an alternative approach for treating psychosis as well as other mental health disorders developed in the 1980s in Finland by Yrjö Alanen and his collaborators. Open dialogue interventions are currently being trialed in several other countries including Australia, Austria, Denmark, Germany, Italy, Norway, Poland, the United Kingdom, and the United States. In Israel there is a non-governmental organization called Open Dialogue Israel.

Key principles of the Open Dialogue method include: the participation of friends and family, responding to the client's utterances (which may seem nonsensical in the case of psychosis), trying to make meaning of what a client has to say, and "tolerating uncertainty".

Theoretical basis 

In a paper illustrating the Open dialogue method Seikkula, Alakar and Aaltonen postulate that "from the social constructionist point of view, psychosis can be seen as one way of dealing with terrifying experience in one's life that do not have language other than the one of hallucinations and delusions" and that "psychotic reactions should be seen [as] attempts to make sense of one's experiences that are so heavy that they have made it impossible to construct a rational spoken narrative" arguing that people may talk about such experiences in metaphor.

They offer a model that "psychotic reactions greatly resemble traumatic experiences" with experiences of victimization "not being stored in the part of the memory system that promotes sense-making". Postulating that "an open dialogue, without any preplanned themes or forms seems to be important in enabling the construction of a new language in which to express difficult events in one's life."

This understanding differs radically from common psychiatric models of psychosis that view it as being caused by a biological process in the brain, such as  the dopamine hypothesis of schizophrenia.

Effectiveness 

A systematic review of academic publications on the topic in 2018 concluded that: "most studies were highly biased and of low quality" and that "further studies are needed in a real-world setting to explore how and why [open dialogue] works."

"Open Dialogue for Psychosis: Organising Mental Health Services to Prioritise Dialogue, Relationship and Meaning", edited by Putman and Martindale was published in 2021. It includes chapters on long term randomised, controlled research projects currently underway in the UK, Italy and Denmark to establish an evidence base for Open Dialogue in those national health services, funded by grants from the NIH in the UK and the Ministry of Health in Italy. In the UK, five NHS trusts are involved with a common training regime for both clinic and peer worker participant staff and have enrolled participant service users. In Italy, eight regional mental health services are involved in that trial.

In Denmark, a trial was conducted across five municipalites, and in 2019, Buus et al published a retrospective register study, where they compared the level of contact with emergency and general practice services by young people who had been assisted by Open Dialogue services compared with those assisted by treatment-as-usual services in Denmark, and found that in the first year those in the Open dialogue cohort had more contacts but in the following years fewer, concluding that "Open Dialogue was significantly associated with some reduced risks of utilising health care services. These mixed results should be tested in a randomized design."

References 

Treatment of mental disorders
Treatment of psychosis

External Links 
https://developingopendialogue.com/resources/
https://open-dialogue.net